The City Junior A Hurling Championship (known for sponsorship reasons as the BCE Consulting Engineers City Junior A Hurling Championship) is an annual hurling competition organised by the Seandún Board of the Gaelic Athletic Association since 1926 for junior-graded hurling teams in Cork, Ireland.

The series of games are usually played during the summer months. The championship uses a double elimination format whereby each team is guaranteed at least two games.

The City Junior Championship is an integral part of the wider Cork Junior Hurling Championship. The winners and runners-up of the City Championship join their counterparts from the other six divisions to contest the county championship.

13 clubs currently participate in the City Championship.

Nemo Rangers are the title-holders after defeating Brian Dillons by 0-13 to 1-06 in the 2022 championship final.

Teams

2023 teams

Roll of honour

List of Finals

2022 Championship

First round 
Na Piarsaigh 1-12 - 2-23 Whitechurch

Nemo Rangers 1-18 - 1-05 Bishopstown

St Finbarrs 0-18 - 2-33 St Vincents

Glen Rovers 0-18 - 0-12 Whites Cross

Blackrock 2-11 - 3-25 Passage

Second round
Brian Dillons 3-22 - 1-08 Blackrock

Na Piarsaigh 4-22 - 1-11 St Finbarrs

Bishopstown 0-12 - 0-06 Whites Cross

Quarter-finals
Glen Rovers 0-17 - 3-15 Nemo Rangers

Bishopstown 1-12 - 2-22 Whitechurch

St Vincents 0-13 - 1-22 Brian Dillons

Passage 2-18 - 0-06 Na Piarsaigh

Semi-finals
Passage 4-08 - 2-23 Brian Dillons

Whitechurch 2-06 - 1-14 Nemo Rangers

Final
Brian Dillons 1-06 - 0-13 Nemo Rangers

Records

Gaps

Top ten longest gaps between successive championship titles:
 38 years: Brian Dillons (1968–2006)
 32 years: Mayfield (1935–1967)
 30 years: Blackrock (1973–2003)
 27 years: Brian Dillons (1938–1965)
 27 years: Nemo Rangers (1964–1991)
 26 years: Na Piarsaigh (1953–1979)
 21 years: Blackrock (1949–1970)
 21 years: Mayfield (1978–1999)
 17 years: Glen Rovers (1968–1975)
 17 years: Douglas (1966–1983)

See also
 City Junior A Football Championship

References

External links
 Seandún GAA website

City Junior A Football Championship